Hervé Dagorné (born 30 January 1967) is a French former cyclist, who currently works as a directeur sportif for UCI Continental team . He competed at the 1988 Summer Olympics and the 1992 Summer Olympics.

References

External links
 

1967 births
Living people
French male cyclists
Olympic cyclists of France
Cyclists at the 1988 Summer Olympics
Cyclists at the 1992 Summer Olympics
People from L'Haÿ-les-Roses
French track cyclists
Sportspeople from Val-de-Marne
Cyclists from Île-de-France